Christopher Arthur Pickett (26 August 1926 – October 1995) was an English cricketer.  Pickett was a left-handed batsman who bowled slow left-arm orthodox as well as left-arm fast.  He was born at Hedgerley, Buckinghamshire.

Pickett made his debut for Buckinghamshire in the 1949 Minor Counties Championship against Oxfordshire.  Pickett played Minor counties cricket for Buckinghamshire from 1949 to 1970, which included 69 Minor Counties Championship matches. In 1965, he made his List A debut against Middlesex in the Gillette Cup.  He made 3 further List A appearances for the county, the last coming against Hampshire in the 1970 Gillette Cup. In his 4 List A matches, he took 7 wickets at a bowling average of 22.28, with best figures of 4/20.

In his career, Pickett also played a single first-class match for a combined Minor Counties cricket team against the touring Australians in 1953. In this match, he scored 7* in the Minor Counties first-innings and in their second-innings he was dismissed for 3 by Richie Benaud.  He also bowled 13 wicket-less overs in the match.

He died sometime in October 1995.

References

External links
Christopher Pickett at ESPNcricinfo
Christopher Pickett at CricketArchive

1926 births
1995 deaths
People from South Bucks District
English cricketers
Buckinghamshire cricketers
Minor Counties cricketers